There are around 240 species in the genus Utricularia, belonging to the bladderwort family (Lentibulariaceae).  It is the largest genus of carnivorous plants and has a worldwide distribution, being absent only from Antarctica and the oceanic islands. This genus was considered to have 250 species until Peter Taylor reduced the number to 214 in his exhaustive study, The genus Utricularia - a taxonomic monograph, published by HMSO (1989). Taylor's classification is generally accepted, though his division of the genus into two subgenera was soon seen as obsolete. Molecular genetic studies have mostly confirmed Taylor's sections with some modifications (Jobson et al., 2003), but reinstalled the division of the genus in three subgenera. This list follows the subgeneric classification sensu Müller & Borsch (2005), updated with new information in Müller et al. (2006).

For a list of known Utricularia species by common name, see Utricularia species by common name.

Subgenus Bivalvaria

Section Aranella

Utricularia blanchetii
Utricularia costata
Utricularia fimbriata
Utricularia laciniata
Utricularia longeciliata
Utricularia parthenopipes
Utricularia purpureocaerulea
Utricularia rostrata
Utricularia sandwithii
Utricularia simulans

Section Australes

Utricularia delicatula
Utricularia lateriflora
Utricularia simplex

Section Avesicarioides
Utricularia rigida
Utricularia tetraloba

Section Benjaminia
Utricularia nana

Section Calpidisca

Utricularia arenaria
Utricularia bisquamata
Utricularia firmula
Utricularia livida
Utricularia microcalyx
Utricularia odontosepala
Utricularia pentadactyla
Utricularia sandersonii
Utricularia troupinii
Utricularia welwitschii

Section Enskide
Utricularia chrysantha
Utricularia fulva

Section Lloydia
Utricularia pubescens

Section Minutae
Utricularia simmonsii

Section Nigrescentes

Utricularia bracteata
Utricularia caerulea
Utricularia warburgii

Section Oligocista
Utricularia adpressa
Utricularia albocaerulea
Utricularia andongensis
Utricularia arcuata
Utricularia babui
Utricularia bifida
Utricularia bosminifera
Utricularia cecilii
Utricularia chiribiquitensis
Utricularia circumvoluta
Utricularia delphinioides
Utricularia densiflora
Utricularia erectiflora
Utricularia foveolata
Utricularia graminifolia
Utricularia heterosepala
Utricularia involvens
Utricularia jackii
Utricularia laxa
Utricularia lazulina
Utricularia letestui
Utricularia lloydii
Utricularia macrocheilos
Utricularia malabarica
Utricularia meyeri
Utricularia micropetala
Utricularia odorata
Utricularia pierrei
Utricularia pobeguinii
Utricularia polygaloides
Utricularia praeterita
Utricularia prehensilis
Utricularia recta
Utricularia reticulata
Utricularia scandens
Utricularia smithiana
Utricularia spiralis
Utricularia subramanyamii
Utricularia tortilis
Utricularia uliginosa
Utricularia vitellina
Utricularia wightiana

Section Phyllaria
Utricularia brachiata
Utricularia christopheri
Utricularia corynephora
Utricularia forrestii
Utricularia furcellata
Utricularia garrettii
Utricularia inthanonensis
Utricularia kumaonensis
Utricularia moniliformis
Utricularia multicaulis
Utricularia phusoidaoensis
Utricularia pulchra
Utricularia salwinensis
Utricularia spinomarginata
Utricularia steenisii
Utricularia striatula

Section Stomoisia
Utricularia cornuta
Utricularia juncea

Subgenus Polypompholyx

Section Pleiochasia

Utricularia albiflora
Utricularia ameliae
Utricularia barkeri
Utricularia beaugleholei
Utricularia benthamii
Utricularia blackmanii
Utricularia dichotoma
Utricularia fenshamii
Utricularia fistulosa
Utricularia grampiana
Utricularia hamiltonii
Utricularia helix
Utricularia inaequalis
Utricularia menziesii
Utricularia paulineae
Utricularia petertaylorii
Utricularia singeriana
Utricularia terrae-reginae
Utricularia triflora
Utricularia tubulata
Utricularia violacea
Utricularia volubilis

Section Lasiocaules

 Utricularia albertiana
 Utricularia antennifera
 Utricularia arnhemica
 Utricularia bidentata
Utricularia capilliflora
Utricularia cheiranthos
Utricularia dunlopii
Utricularia dunstaniae
Utricularia georgei
Utricularia holtzei
Utricularia kamienskii
Utricularia kenneallyi
Utricularia kimberleyensis
Utricularia lasiocaulis
Utricularia leptorhyncha
Utricularia lowriei
Utricularia magna
Utricularia papilliscapa
Utricularia quinquedentata
Utricularia rhododactylos
Utricularia tridactyla
 Utricularia uniflora
Utricularia wannanii

Section Polypompholyx
Utricularia multifida
Utricularia tenella

Section Tridentaria
Utricularia westonii

Subgenus Utricularia

Section Avesicaria
Utricularia neottioides
Utricularia oliveriana

Section Candollea
Utricularia podadena

Section Chelidon
Utricularia mannii

Section Choristothecae
Utricularia choristotheca
Utricularia determannii

Section Foliosa

Utricularia amethystina
Utricularia calycifida
Utricularia hintonii
Utricularia hispida
Utricularia huntii
Utricularia longifolia
Utricularia panamensis
Utricularia petersoniae
Utricularia praelonga
Utricularia regia
Utricularia schultesii
Utricularia tricolor
Utricularia tridentata

Section Kamienskia
Utricularia mangshanensis
Utricularia peranomala

Section Lecticula
Utricularia resupinata
Utricularia spruceana

Section Martinia
Utricularia tenuissima

Section Meionula
Utricularia geoffrayi
Utricularia hirta
Utricularia minutissima

Section Mirabiles
Utricularia heterochroma
Utricularia mirabilis

Section Nelipus
Utricularia biloba
Utricularia leptoplectra
Utricularia limosa

Section Oliveria
Utricularia appendiculata

Section Orchidioides

Utricularia alpina
Utricularia asplundii
Utricularia buntingiana
Utricularia campbelliana
Utricularia cornigera
Utricularia endresii
Utricularia geminiloba
Utricularia humboldtii
Utricularia jamesoniana

Utricularia nelumbifolia
Utricularia nephrophylla
Utricularia praetermissa
Utricularia quelchii
Utricularia reniformis
Utricularia unifolia
Utricularia uxoris

Section Setiscapella

Utricularia flaccida
Utricularia nervosa
Utricularia nigrescens
Utricularia physoceras
Utricularia pusilla
Utricularia stanfieldii
Utricularia subulata
Utricularia trichophylla
Utricularia triloba

Section Sprucea
Utricularia viscosa

Section Steyermarkia
Utricularia aureomaculata
Utricularia cochleata
Utricularia steyermarkii

Section Stylotheca
Utricularia guyanensis

Section Utricularia

Utricularia aurea
Utricularia australis
Utricularia benjaminiana
Utricularia biovularioides
Utricularia bremii
Utricularia breviscapa
Utricularia chiakiana
Utricularia corneliana
Utricularia cymbantha
Utricularia dimorphantha
Utricularia floridana
Utricularia foliosa
Utricularia geminiscapa
Utricularia gibba
Utricularia hydrocarpa
Utricularia incisa
Utricularia inflata
Utricularia inflexa
Utricularia intermedia
Utricularia macrorhiza
Utricularia minor
Utricularia muelleri
Utricularia naviculata
Utricularia ochroleuca
Utricularia olivacea
Utricularia perversa
Utricularia platensis
Utricularia poconensis
Utricularia punctata
Utricularia radiata
Utricularia raynalii
Utricularia reflexa
Utricularia stellaris
Utricularia striata
Utricularia stygia
Utricularia vulgaris
Utricularia warmingii

Section Vesiculina
Utricularia cucullata
Utricularia myriocista
Utricularia purpurea

See also
Utricularia capillacea
Utricularia linearis

Notes

References 

Lowrie A, Cowie ID, and Conran JG. (2008). A new species and section of Utricularia (Lentibulariaceae) from northern Australia. Telopea, 12(1): 31-46.
 Jobson RW, Playford J, Cameron KM, Albert VA. (2003). Molecular phylogenetics of Lentibulariaceae inferred from plastid rps16 intron and trnLF DNA sequences: implications for character evolution and biogeography. Systematic Botany, 28(1): 157-171.  
Jobson RW, Baleeiro PC, Reut MS (2017). Molecular phylogeny of subgenus Polypompholyx (Utricularia; Lentibulariaceae) based on three plastid markers: diversification and proposal for a new section. Australian Systematic Botany, 30: 259-278. https://doi.org/10.1071/SB17003
Jobson RW, Baleeiro PC, Barrett MD (2018). Six new species of Utricularia (Lentibulariaceae) from Northern Australia. Telopea, 21: 57-77. https://doi.org/10.7751/telopea12630
Müller KF and Borsch T. (2005). Phylogenetics of Utricularia (Lentibulariaceae) and molecular evolution of the trnK intron in a lineage with high substitutional rates. Plant Systematics and Evolution, 250: 39-67. 
Müller KF, Borsch T, Legendre L, Porembski S, and Barthlott W. (2006). Recent progress in understanding the evolution of carnivorous Lentibulariaceae (Lamiales). Plant Biology, 8: 748-757. 
Taylor, Peter. (1989). The genus Utricularia - a taxonomic monograph. Kew Bulletin Additional Series XIV: London.

External links 
A large Utricularia photo gallery

Utricularia
Utricularia, List